Ayessha Quraishi (born October 28, 1970) is a contemporary visual artist who lives and works in Karachi, Pakistan. Having received her initial art training from Karachi-based educator Nayyar Jamil, she has been working for over three decades on the development of her signature technique and visual language. Her practice often integrates various media including drawing, painting, sculpture, performance and digital photography. 
Quraishi is a prominent artist whose work has been widely shown, both locally and internationally. She participated in the international Istanbul Biennial in 2019. More recently in 2020, Koel Gallery presented Quraishi’s major mid-career retrospective Between Light in Karachi, featuring works spanning thirty-five years (1985-2020) of her prolific and ongoing career. Accompanying the mid-career retrospective, a comprehensive monograph was published in February 2020.

Early life
Ayessha Quraishi’s early years were spent in Cornwall and Islamabad before her family settled in Karachi in 1976. At the age of seven her father passed away which had a profound effect on her as she first came to question life, from its surface of fact to subtler dimensions. The transition from the representational to abstract was a natural process that found expression in her work from an early stage.

Work
Ayessha Quraishi initiated her art career as an art teacher at the Convent of Jesus and Mary, Karachi in 1988. Between 1988 and 1993, she taught children at the Art Workshop alongside designing furniture. From 1993 to 2000, Ayessha worked as a business partner and designer for the store Solo. Subsequently from 2003 to 2010, she worked in the same capacity for Karachi-based home accessories store Object.

In 2022 Quraishi and Marium Agha were nominated for the 2022 Sovereign Asian Art Prize.

Art career
Ayessha Quraishi’s work has been exhibited widely in Pakistan and internationally in both group and solo exhibitions.

Solo Shows
 Mid-career retrospective “Between Light” at Koel Gallery, Karachi (2020)
 "All that is, is held" at Canvas Gallery, Karachi (2018)
 "Open presence" at Koel Gallery, Karachi (2016)
 "Liminal" at Khaas Art Gallery, Islamabad (2013)
 "Continuous/Present" at Rothas II, Lahore (2013)
 "Letters From An Underground Vein Road" at Koel Gallery, Karachi (2012)
 Indus Gallery, Karachi (1998)
 The Art Gallery, Islamabad (1997)
 NCA Gallery, Lahore (1995)
 Gallery Ardeco Avignon, Avignon (1995)

Group Shows
 "Awaken Our Legacy" Standard Chartered Bank, WTC Branch, Karachi (2016)
 "Birwa" Showdown 2015, Sadequain Gallery, Karachi (2015)
 "Summer Scape 2014" Koel Gallery, Karachi (2014)
 "October Passage" Canakkale, Turkey (2013)
 "Summer Scape 2013" Koel Gallery, Karachi (2013)
 "Intimacy" Koel Gallery, Karachi (2013)
 "Abstract Art In Contemporary Russia" Moscow (2012)
 "Universal Sapience" Freiburg, Germany (2012)
 La Galleria Pall Mall, London, United Kingdom (2011)
 Takhti Project, Toronto, Canada (2002)
 Takhti Project, Sadequain Gallery, Karachi, Pakistan (2001)
 Alliance Françoise, Karachi, Pakistan (2000)
 Alliance Françoise, Karachi, Pakistan (1999)
 Zenini Gallery, Karachi, Pakistan (1998)
 Gallery Ardeco Avignon, France (1996)
 Gallery Sadequain, Karachi, Pakistan (1995)
 PNCA Gallery, Islamabad, Pakistan (1995)
 Shakir Ali Gallery, Lahore, Pakistan (1991)
 Shakir Ali Gallery, Lahore, Pakistan (1990)
 VM Gallery, Karachi, Pakistan (1989)

Biennales
 International Istanbul Biennial, Istanbul (2019)
 Karachi Biennale, Karachi (2017)
 Bodrum Biennial, Bodrum (2013)
 Izmir Biennale, Izmir (2011)

International Public Art Festivals
 “Karachi Ki Khoj” [Redefining The Metropolis] IPAF, Karachi (2020)
 "Mostra Internazionale di Pittura" in Matera, Italy (2014)

Performance
 "Riwhyti” One Night Stand, Amin Gulgee Gallery, Karachi (2018)
 “Scroll”, Koel Gallery, Karachi (2012)

Artist residences
 "Recorded Time" at Koel Gallery (2017)
 "Hic-2" Workshop in Turgurtreis / Bodrum (2013)
 Winter Academy, Egypt, Fayoum (2011)
 International Painting Symposium, Egypt, Luxor (2010)
 Association Saint-Henri, France (1996)

Publication
The Monograph Between Light was published on the occasion of Ayessha Quraishi’s mid-career retrospective on the 4th of February 2020. It is a comprehensive volume on the work of the artist’s prolific and continuing career spanning thirty-five years from 1985 to 2020.

It includes a curatorial essay by Zarmeene Shah and articles by Quddus Mirza, Maha Malik and Aasim Akhtar.

References

External links
 Official Ayessha Quraishi website
 Object store website
 Between Light

Pakistani women painters
Pakistani contemporary artists
Artists from Karachi
21st-century Pakistani artists
21st-century women artists
1970 births
Living people
21st-century Pakistani painters